The Perpetrators is the debut album from Canadian blues-rock group The Perpetrators.  The album was released in 2003.

Track listing
 "12,000 Miles"
 "One More Day"
 "Crappy Job"
 "Look at You"
 "Hollywood"
 "1/4 to 5"
 "Stay Strong"
 "Toe Stub"
 "Garmonbozia"
 "Six-Pack"
 "Malt Liquor"
 "Hate Song"
 "12,000 Vocoders"

2003 debut albums
The Perpetrators albums